Kumara haemanthifolia is a species of flowering plant in the family Asphodelaceae. It is a rare species of succulent plant, native to a few high, inaccessible mountain peaks in the Fynbos habitat of Western Cape, South Africa.

Description
Kumara haemanthifolia is a small bunched plant, related to aloes, with greyish-green, tongue-shaped leaves that grow in a fan shape, similar to its sister species Kumara plicatilis, the fan-aloe. In fact, it looks very much like a diminutive, stemless form of the tree-like Kumara plicatilis. Its compact ranks of leaves are oblong and grey-green in colour, with bright red margins.

Small and close to the ground, it often escapes notice or is mistaken for a lily. In fact, its name "haemanthifolia" was given because of its resemblance to the popular Haemanthus bulbs.

It produces bright scarlet flowers at the end of winter (September up until November in its natural habitat).

Distribution
Its natural range also nearly matches that of Kumara plicatilis (being the mountainous area from Stellenbosch through to Ceres) but Kumara haemanthifolia occurs further up on the mountain peaks than its larger sister species. The plant seems to prefer cold south-facing slopes with heavy winter rainfall. It grows in sheltered cracks in sandstone ridges, forming dense clumps.

Tucked inside crevices in its natural habitat it is very hardy - surviving both frost and fire. It has a large, strong root stock - meaning that the plant can re-sprout again, even after all of the plant above ground has been totally destroyed by veld fire.

Cultivation
It is a very difficult plant to cultivate, and it usually soon dies if planted outside of its natural habitat.

See also
Cape Floristic Region
Index: Fynbos - habitats and species

References

External links

Asphodeloideae
Endemic flora of South Africa
Flora of the Cape Provinces
Fynbos
Critically endangered flora of Africa
IUCN Red List critically endangered species
Taxa named by Rudolf Marloth
Taxa named by Alwin Berger